The County of Wonnangatta is one of the 37 counties of Victoria which are part of the cadastral divisions of Australia, used for land titles. It includes the western parts of the Alpine National Park. The Wonnangatta River is located in the east of the county. Lake Eildon is at the northwestern edge. Mount Buller is on the northern edge.

Parishes 
Parishes include:
 Billabong, Victoria
 Bolaira, Victoria
 Boorolite, Victoria
 Buckenderra, Victoria
 Budgee Budgee, Victoria
 Buragwonduc, Victoria
 Changue, Victoria
 Cobbannah, Victoria
 Crookayan, Victoria
 Darlingford, Victoria
 Doledrook, Victoria
 Enoch's Point, Victoria
 Goulburn, Victoria
 Howqua, Victoria
 Howqua West, Victoria
 Jamieson, Victoria
 Kevington, Victoria
 Knockwood, Victoria
 Kybeyan, Victoria
 Lauraville, Victoria
 Licola, Victoria
 Lodge Park, Victoria
 Matlock, Victoria
 Miowera, Victoria
 Moroka, Victoria
 Narbourac, Victoria
 St.Clair, Victoria
 Tamboritha, Victoria
 Taponga, Victoria
 Tarldarn, Victoria
 Torbreck, Victoria
 Warrambat, Victoria
 Wonnangatta, Victoria
 Youarrabuk, Victoria

References
Vicnames, place name details
Research aids, Victoria 1910
Map of the Wonnangatta region in Victoria showing county boundaries, parishes, available agricultural and grazing land, available pastoral land, available land to be sold at auction and timber reserves 1893, Dept. of Lands and Survey. held at the National Library of Australia

Counties of Victoria (Australia)